Ansistaria is a genus of African crab spiders first described by Danniella Sherwood in 2022.  it contains only two species.

References

Araneomorphae genera
Thomisidae